Juan Gervasio Minujín (born May 20, 1975) is an Argentine actor and film director. He is the nephew of plastic artist Marta Minujín.

Career 
He trained as an actor with Cristina Banegas, Julio Chávez, Alberto Ure, Pompeyo Audivert and Guillermo Angelelli. In 1996 he began to work in theater. Between 1997 and 1998 he moved to London, where he completed his training as an actor. From 2000 he does it as a guest actor with the group El Descueve, with which he participates in tours in Latin America and Europe.

Filmography

Movies

Television

Theater 
 Venus en piel - Dir. Javier Daulte
 El principio de Arquímedes
 Living-Todos Felices - Dir. Oscar Martínez
 Jardín-Todos Felices - Dir. Oscar Martínez
 Comedor-Todos Felices - Dir. Oscar Martínez
 El Pasado es un Animal Grotesco - M. Pensotti
 Sucio - Dir. Ana Frenkel / M. Pensotti
 Cuchillos en gallinas Dir. A. Tantanian
 Rebenque Show
 Vapor - Dir. Mariano Pensotti
 Conferencia - Dir. Martin Bauer
 El Malogrado - Dir. Martin Bauer
 Hermosura - Europe Tour
 Patito Feo - With the group El Descueve
 Hermosura - With the group El Descueve
 El pasajero del barco del sol
 Espumantes
 Edipo Rey de Hungría
 Luna - Dir. Marcelo Katz
 Las Troyanas
 Hamlet
 La Funerala
 Nada & Ave
 La Verdad

Videoclips

Awards and nominations

References

External links 
 Juan Minujín at cinenacional.com
 

1975 births
Living people
Male actors from Buenos Aires
Argentine male film actors
Argentine people of Jewish descent
Argentine people of Lebanese descent
Argentine Druze